The Camerata or camerate crinoids are an extinct subclass of Paleozoic stalked crinoids. They were some of the earliest crinoids to originate during the Early Ordovician, reached their maximum diversity during the Mississippian, and became extinct during the Permian–Triassic extinction event. Camerates are the sister group of Pentacrinoidea, which contains all other crinoids (including living species). The two largest camerate subgroups are the orders Diplobathrida and Monobathrida.

Anatomically, they are distinguished by:
fused junctions between the plates of the cup
brachial plates incorporated into the cup
tegmen forming a rigid roof over the mouth
no less than ten and sometimes a very large number of free arms, often pinnulate

Subdivisions 

 Order Cladida?
 Adelphicrinus
 Eknomocrinus
 Cnemecrinus
 Quechuacrinus
 Reteocrinus
 Eucamerata
 Rosfacrinus
 Order Diplobathrida
 Order Monobathrida

References

External links 
Camerata in the Paleobiology Database

 
Devonian crinoids
Late Devonian animals
Carboniferous crinoids
Silurian crinoids
Middle Devonian first appearances
Late Devonian extinctions